Islam Siam (born February 13, 1985) is an Egyptian football player who plays as a defender for Egyptian club El Dakhleya SC. He was a member of Egyptian U-21 youth team, participating in 2005 FIFA World Youth Championship held in the Netherlands.

Honours

National team
 Gold Medalist at Qatar U23 International Tournament 2007.
 Silver Medalist at CAF Youth African Cup 2005.

Arab Contractors
 Egypt Cup: 2004

References

1985 births
Living people
Egyptian footballers
Egyptian expatriate footballers
Al Ittihad Alexandria Club players
Pyramids FC players
Egypt youth international footballers
Association football defenders
Egyptian Premier League players
Lebanese Premier League players
Al Mokawloon Al Arab SC players
El Shams SC players
Ghazl El Mahalla SC players
Al Nasr Lel Taa'den SC players
Footballers from Cairo
Expatriate footballers in Lebanon